Ya Tung is a commune in Ou Ya Dav District in northeast Cambodia. It contains five villages and has a population of 1,751. In the 2007 commune council elections, four of the commune's five seats went to the Cambodian People's Party and one went to the Sam Rainsy Party. The land alienation rates in Ya Tung was moderate as of January 2006. (See Ratanakiri Province for background information on land alienation.)

Villages

References

Communes of Ratanakiri province